Andy may refer to:

People
Andy (given name), including a list of people and fictional characters
Horace Andy (born 1951), Jamaican roots reggae songwriter and singer born Horace Hinds
Katja Andy (1907–2013), German-American pianist and piano professor
Andy (singer) (born 1958), stage name of Iranian-Armenian singer Andranik Madadian

Music
Andy (1976 album), an album by Andy Williams
Andy (2001 album), an album by Andy Williams
Andy (Raleigh Ritchie album), a 2020 album by Raleigh Ritchie
"Andy" (song), a 1986 song by Les Rita Mitsouko

Other uses
Andy (film), a 1965 film
Andy (goose) (1987–1991), a sneaker-wearing goose born without webbed feet
Andy (typeface), a monotype font
Andy, West Virginia, US, a former unincorporated community

See also
Andi (disambiguation)
Typhoon Andy (disambiguation)